Trenton is a masculine given name. Bearers include:

 Trent Ashby (born 1972, American politician
 Trenton Cannon (born 1994), American National Football League running back
 Trenton Estep (born 1999), American racing driver
 Trenton Gill (born 1999), American National Football League punter
 Trent Guy (born 1987), American football player
 Trenton Doyle Hancock (born 1974), American artist
 Trent Harmon (born 1990), American musician, winner of the fifteenth and final season of American Idol
 Trenton Hassell (born 1979), American former National Basketball Association player
 Trenton Irwin (born 1995), American National Football League player
 Trenton Meacham (born 1985), American professional basketball player
 Trenton Merricks, professor of philosophy
 Trenton Robinson (born 1990), American former National Football League player
 Trent Scott (born 1994), American National Football League player
 Trenton Shipley (born 1973), Australian painter and artist
 Trenton Lee Stewart (born 1970), American author
 T. J. Jackson (wide receiver) (1943–2007), American National Football League player
 Trent Richardson (born 1990), American football running back
 Trent Williams (born 1988), American National Football League player

English-language masculine given names